Adrian Galliani (born April 28, 2001) is an American professional soccer player who plays as a defender or a midfielder.

Career
As a youth player, Galliani joined the academy of English second tier side Reading. After that, he joined the youth academy of AC Milan in the Italian Serie A. In 2018, he joined American club IMG Academy. Before the second half of 2019–20, Galliani joined the youth academy of Nottingham Forest in the English second tier.

In 2021, he signed for Greek team Olympiacos B. On 12 January 2021, he debuted for Olympiacos B in a 2–1 loss to Thesprotos.

Personal life
Galliani is the grandson of former AC Milan chairman and current Monza CEO Adriano Galliani.

References

External links
 Adrian Galliani at playmakerstats.com

2001 births
Living people
Soccer players from New York City
American people of Italian descent
American soccer players
Association football defenders
Association football midfielders
Reading F.C. players
A.C. Milan players
IMG Academy Bradenton players
Watford F.C. players
Nottingham Forest F.C. players
Olympiacos F.C. players
Panionios F.C. players
Super League Greece 2 players
American expatriate soccer players
American expatriate sportspeople in England
American expatriate sportspeople in Italy
American expatriate sportspeople in Greece
Expatriate footballers in England
Expatriate footballers in Italy
Expatriate footballers in Greece